Frederikus (Frans) Gerardus Hukomstamboekkaart (military) (28 September 1915 – 3 July 1989) was an Indonesian football defender who played for the Dutch East Indies in the 1938 FIFA World Cup. He also played for Sparta Bandung.

References

External links
 

1917 births
1989 deaths
Indonesian footballers
Indonesia international footballers
Association football defenders
1938 FIFA World Cup players
20th-century Indonesian people